Matt Maginn is a musician from Omaha, Nebraska. He plays bass guitar in the indie-rock band Cursive and is a frequent contributor on a number of  Bright Eyes records. He was also a founding member of Slowdown Virginia.

He also helps run Team Love Records and was previously with Saddle Creek Records for 5 years.

He graduated from Creighton University with a degree in Environmental Science.

Album appearances

With Cursive
 Such Blinding Stars for Starving Eyes (1997, Crank! Records)
 The Storms of Early Summer: Semantics of Song (1998, Saddle Creek Records)
 Domestica (2000, Saddle Creek Records)
 Burst and Bloom (2001, Saddle Creek Records)
 8 Teeth to Eat You (2002, Better Looking Records
 The Ugly Organ (2003, Saddle Creek Records)
 Happy Hollow (2006, Saddle Creek Records)
 Mama, I'm Swollen (2009, Saddle Creek records)
 I Am Gemini (2012, Saddle Creek records)

Other
 Bright Eyes - Letting off the Happiness (1998 · Saddle Creek Records)
 Bright Eyes - Every Day and Every Night (1999 · Saddle Creek Records)
 Bright Eyes - Fevers and Mirrors (2000 · Saddle Creek Records)
 Bright Eyes - There Is No Beginning to the Story (2002, Saddle Creek Records)
 Bright Eyes - Lifted or The Story is in the Soil, Keep Your Ear to the Ground (2002 · Saddle Creek Records)
 Bright Eyes - Lua (Single) (2004 · Saddle Creek Records)
 Bright Eyes - I'm Wide Awake, It's Morning (2005 · Saddle Creek records)
 Mayday - Bushido Karaoke (2005 · Saddle Creek records)
 Tim Kasher - The Game of Monogamy (2010 · Saddle Creek records)
 Man Man - Life Fantastic (2011 · Anti-)
 Bright Eyes - The People's Key (2011 · Saddle Creek records)

References

External links
 Saddle Creek Records
 Cursive
 Team Love Records

American indie rock musicians
American bass guitarists
Creighton University alumni
Living people
Year of birth missing (living people)
Musicians from Omaha, Nebraska
Cursive (band) members